Acer yinkunii is a rare Asian species of maple. It has been found only in Guangxi Province in southern China.

Acer yinkunii is a shrub or small tree up to 5 meters tall with brown or purple bark. Leaves are non-compound, up to 5.5 cm wide and 2 cm across, leathery, with no lobes but a long tapering point at the tip.

References

External links
line drawing for Flora of China figure 1 at right

yinkunii
Plants described in 1966
Flora of Guangxi